Hofgaard Park is a narrow park between Kaumuali'i Highway and Waimea Road in the town of Waimea.  The park was named after Judge Christopher Blom Hofgaard who was a resident in Waimea.  It features a statue of Captain Cook, which is a replica of an original statue in Whitby, England.  

The park is dedicated to the historic events of Captain Cook's landing nearby. A timeline of Waimea and Western influence are documented on plaques in the park.

Captain James Cook was the first European reported to have sighted the Hawaiian Islands, and the January 20 landfall on southwestern Kauai was his first arrival upon Hawaiian soil.  On January 20, 1778, two ships under the command of British navigator Captain James Cook set anchor at the mouth of the Waimea River.  The crew was able to converse with the native people having been acquainted with the Tahitian language.  They spent two weeks on Kauai provisioning their ships for the journey north.  The British explorers were amazed at the finding of Polynesian people on these remote islands.

The actual landing site was probably located in what is now Lucy Wright Park, near the mouth of the Waimea River, just south of the town of Waimea.  A plaque at the park commemorates Cook's landing on the island.

Gallery

References

External References
National Park Service: Cook Landing Site

History of Kauai
Parks in Hawaii